Fabienne is a feminine French and English given name. Notable people with the name include:

 Fabienne André (born 1996), British athlete
 Fabienne Brugère (born in 1964), French philosopher, academic
 Fabienne Dufour (born 1981), Belgian swimmer 
 Fabienne Feraez (born 1976), Beninese sprinter
 Fabienne Keller (born 1959), French politician
 Fabienne Kabou (born 1977), French convicted murderer
 Fabienne Reuteler (born 1979), Swiss snowboarder
 Fabienne Serrat (born 1956), French ski alpine racer and world champion
 Fabienne Shine (21st century), French model, musician and actor
 Fabienne Suter (born 1985), Swiss Alpine skier
 Fabienne Thibeault (born 1952), Canadian singer

The name is derived from the female version of "Fabianus" and "Fabien" and means "the noble".

in other languages the name may be as follows:
 Fabiana (Latin)
 Fabiana (Italian)
 Fabiana (Portuguese and Spanish)

References

French feminine given names
English feminine given names
English-language feminine given names